Screen Directors Playhouse (sometimes written as Screen Directors' Playhouse) is an American radio and television anthology series which brought leading Hollywood actors to the NBC microphones beginning in 1949. The radio program broadcast adaptations of films, with original directors of the films sometimes involved in the productions, although their participation was usually limited to introducing the radio adaptations and taking a brief "curtain call" with the cast and host at the end of the program. During the 1955–56 season, the series was seen on television, focusing on original teleplays and several adaptations of famous short stories (such as Robert Louis Stevenson's "Markheim").

Radio
The radio version ran for 122 episodes and aired on NBC from January 9, 1949, to September 28, 1951, under several different titles: NBC Theater, Screen Directors Guild Assignment, Screen Directors Assignment and, as of July 1, 1949, Screen Directors Playhouse.

Actors on the radio series included Fred Astaire, Lucille Ball, Tallulah Bankhead, Charles Boyer, Claudette Colbert, Ronald Colman, Gary Cooper, Joan Crawford, Bette Davis, Marlene Dietrich, Kirk Douglas, Irene Dunne, Douglas Fairbanks Jr., Henry Fonda, Cary Grant, William Holden, Burt Lancaster, James Mason, Ray Milland, Gregory Peck, William Powell, Edward G. Robinson, Norma Shearer, Barbara Stanwyck, James Stewart, John Wayne, and Loretta Young.

Television
The television version, produced and filmed at Hal Roach Studios, was broadcast for one season of 35 half-hour episodes on NBC, under the sponsorship of Eastman Kodak, airing from October 5, 1955, to June 1956. The final episodes aired on ABC ending on September 26, 1956.

Hal Roach Studios produced the program, and members of the Screen Directors Guild directed the 30-minute filmed episodes. The guild used its income to support its educational and benevolent foundation.

John Wayne appeared in the episode "Rookie of the Year", in "his only real dramatic role on TV", and Errol Flynn's first dramatic role on TV came in "The Sword of Villon".

Billed in the opening credits of their respective television episodes are: Lee Aaker (episode 8), Lola Albright (episode 4), John Alderson (episode 35), Leon Ames (episode 5), Lew Ayres (episode 20), Lynn Bari (episode 4), Ralph Bellamy (episode 19), William Bendix (episode 35), John Bentley (episode 30), Charles Bickford (episode 11), Janet Blair (episode 28), Ward Bond (episode 10), Neville Brand (episode 4), Walter Brennan (episode 8), Hillary Brooke (episode 22), Joe E. Brown (episode 12), Edgar Buchanan (episode 8), Rory Calhoun (episodes 2 and 14), Macdonald Carey (episodes 18 and 32), Jack Carson (episode 4), Joan Caulfield (episode 32), Gower Champion (episode 27), Marge Champion (episode 27), Fred Clark (episode 5), Constance Cummings (episode 33), Linda Darnell (episode 30), Laraine Day (episodes 7 and 17), Yvonne deCarlo (episode 14), Brandon deWilde (episode 29), Bobby Driscoll (episode 2), James Dunn (episode 18), Leo Durocher (episode 17), Robert Easton (episode 15),  Buddy Ebsen (episode 28), Marilyn Erskine (episode 21), Frank Fay (episode 9), Errol Flynn (episode 22), Scott Forbes (episode 30), Wallace Ford (episode 20), Sally Forrest (episode 5), Rita Gam (episode 19), Nancy Gates (episode 9), Leo Genn (episode 13), Greta Granstedt (episode 19), Barbara Hale (episode 1), Don Hanmer (episode 3), Dick Haymes (episode 18), Dennis Hopper (episode 35), Kim Hunter (episode 3), Buster Keaton (episode 12), Angela Lansbury (episode 24), Peter Lawford (episode 9), Cloris Leachman (episode 6), Sheldon Leonard (episode 15), Peter Lorre (episode 16), James Lydon (episode 5), Jeanette MacDonald (episode 17), Jimmy McHugh (episode 21), Fred MacMurray (episode 21), Lotfi Mansouri (episode 34), Vera Miles (episode 10), Ray Milland (episode 23), Sal Mineo (episode 26), Thomas Mitchell (episode 7), George Montgomery (episode 24), Patricia Morison (episode 26), Barry Nelson (episode 28), Edmond O'Brien (episode 25), Dan O'Herlihy (episode 7), Dennis O'Keefe (episode 15), ZaSu Pitts (episode 12), Basil Rathbone (episode 19), Philip Reed (episode 13), Robert Ryan (episode 11), George Sanders (episodes 26 and 33), Herb Shriner (episode 1), Mary Sinclair (episode 28), Rod Steiger (episode 23), William Talman (episode 16), Casey Tibbs (episode 29), June Vincent (episodes 14 [not billed in opening credits] and 18), John Wayne (episode 10), Pat Wayne (episode 10), Michael Wilding (episode 31), Fay Wray (episode 15), Teresa Wright (episode 16), Keenan Wynn (episode 3), May Wynn (episode 13) and Alan Young (episode 6). But there was one difference between the two versions of the program: while the radio program had presented only condensed versions of well-known plays and films, the television version presented mostly original dramas.

The directors of television episodes are: Lewis Allen, Claude Binyon, Frank Borzage (3 episodes), John Brahm (2 episodes), David Butler, Gower Champion, William Dieterle, Allan Dwan (2 episodes), John Ford, Tay Garnett (3 episodes), Hugo Haas, Byron Haskin, Stuart Heisler, Ida Lupino, Leo McCarey (2 episodes), Norman Z. McLeod, George Marshall, Ted Post, H. C. Potter, John Rich, William A. Seiter, George Sherman, Andrew L. Stone, Ted Tetzlaff, Frank Tuttle, George Waggner (2 episodes) and Fred Zinnemann.

Directors, vital dates, years of activity as director, episode titles, writers and broadcast dates
Leo McCarey (1896–1969, 1921–62) "Meet the Governor" (October 5, 1955; also wrote)
Frank Borzage (1894–1962, 1913–61) "Day Is Done" (October 12, 1955; written by William Tunberg)
John Brahm (1893–1982, 1936–67) "A Midsummer Daydream" (October 19, 1955; written by William Saroyan)
George Waggner (1894–1984, 1938–67) "Arroyo" (October 26, 1955; also wrote)
William A. Seiter (1890–1964, 1915–60) "Want Ad Wedding" (November 2, 1955; written by Dane Lussier and Gertrude Walker)
Norman Z. McLeod (1895–1964, 1928–63) "Life of Vernon Hathaway" (November 9, 1955; written by Barbara Merlin; story by Richard Wormser)
Andrew L. Stone (1902–1999, 1927–72) "The Final Tribute" (November 16, 1955; also wrote; story by Octavus Roy Cohen)
Stuart Heisler (1896–1979, 1936–64) "The Brush Roper" (November 23, 1955; written by William Tunberg and Fred Gipson; story by Gipson)
Leo McCarey (see no. 1) "Tom and Jerry" (November 30, 1955; written by Leo McCarey's daughter, Mary McCarey)
John Ford (1894–1973, 1917–66) "Rookie of the Year" (December 7, 1955; written by Frank Nugent; story by W. R. Burnett)
H. C. Potter (1904–1977, 1936–57) "Lincoln's Doctor's Dog" (December 14, 1955; written by William R. Cox; story by Christopher Morley)
George Marshall (1891–1975, 1916–72) "The Silent Partner" (December 21, 1955; also wrote; story by Barbara Hammer)
Ted Tetzlaff (1903–1995, 1941–59) "The Titanic Incident" (December 28, 1955; written by William R. Cox)
Tay Garnett (1894–1977, 1924–75) "Hot Cargo" (January 4, 1956; also story; written by David Dortort)
Allan Dwan (1885–1981, 1911–61) "It's Always Sunday" (January 11, 1956; written by D. D. Beauchamp; story by Jesse Goldstein and Frank Fox)
Ida Lupino (1918–1995, 1949–68) "No. 5 Checked Out" (January 18, 1956; also story; written by Willard Wiener)
David Butler (1894–1979, 1927–67) "Prima Donna" (February 1, 1956; written by Peter Milne and Gene Raymond; story by Raymond)
George Sherman (1908–1991, 1937–78) "Cry Justice" (February 15, 1956; written by Donald Hyde)
Byron Haskin (1899–1984, 1927–68) "Affair in Sumatra" (February 22, 1956; written by Michael Fessier; story by Hobart Donavan)
William Dieterle (1893–1972, 1923–68) "One Against Many" (March 7, 1956; written by Donald S. Sanford; story by John Jacobs and Malvin Ward)
Claude Binyon (1905–1978, 1948–56) "It's a Most Unusual Day" (March 14, 1956; also wrote; story by William R. Cox)
George Waggner (see no. 4) "The Sword of Villon" (April 4, 1956; written by Wilbur S. Peacock)
Fred Zinnemann (1907–1997, 1930–82) "Markheim" (April 11, 1956; written by John McGreevey and Paul Osborn [another source indicates Alfred Harris]; story by Robert Louis Stevenson)
Frank Tuttle (1892–1963, 1922–59) "Claire" (April 25, 1956; written by Philip MacDonald and George Sinclair; story by Ruth Capps)
Frank Borzage (see no. 2) "A Ticket for Thaddeus" (May 9, 1956; written by A. I. Bezzerides; story by Rose C. Feld)
Hugo Haas (1901–1968, 1933–62) "The Dream" (May 16, 1956; written by John McGreevey [another source indicates Richard Karlan and Patricia Karlan]; story by Ivan Turgenev)
Gower Champion (1921–1980, 1956–74) "What Day Is It?" (June 6, 1956; written by Jean Holloway)
Lewis Allen (1905–2000, 1943–77) "Every Man Has Two Wives" (June 13, 1956; written by DeWitt Bodeen and Frank Gill, Jr.; story by Thames Williamson)
Tay Garnett (see no. 14) "Partners" (July 4, 1956; also story; written by Winston Miller)
Ted Post (1918–2013, 1950–99) "White Corridors" (July 11, 1956; written by Irving Cooper and Helen Cooper)
Tay Garnett (see no. 14 and no. 29) "The Carroll Formula" (July 18, 1956; written by John L. Greene)
John Rich (1925–2012, 1951–99) "Apples on the Lilac Tree" (July 25, 1956; written by Lee Loeb and Phil Shuken)
John Brahm (see no. 3) "The Bitter Waters" (August 1, 1956; written by Zoe Akins; story "Louisa Pallant" by Henry James)
Frank Borzage (see no. 2 and no. 25) "The Day I Met Caruso" (September 5, 1956; written by Zoe Akins; story by Elizabeth Bacon Rodewald)
Allan Dwan (see no. 15) "High Air" (September 12, 1956; written by A. I. Bezzerides; story by Borden Chase)

Directors listed by number of "Best Director" Academy Award nominations
Fred Zinnemann (seven): The Search (1948), High Noon (1952), From Here to Eternity (1953: winner), The Nun's Story (1959), The Sundowners (1960), A Man for All Seasons (1966: winner) and Julia (1977) [also received three nominations as producer (1952: winner, 1960 and 1966: winner)]
John Ford (five): The Informer (1935: winner), Stagecoach (1939), The Grapes of Wrath (1940: winner), How Green Was My Valley (1941: winner) and The Quiet Man (1952: winner) [also received one nomination as producer (1952)]
Leo McCarey (three): The Awful Truth (1937: winner), Going My Way (1944: winner) and The Bells of St. Mary's (1945) [also received four nominations for writing (1939, 1940, 1944: winner and 1952) and one nomination for original song (1958)]
Frank Borzage (two): 7th Heaven (1927: winner) and Bad Girl (1931: winner)
William Dieterle (one): The Life of Emile Zola (1937)

Television episodes
Opening announcement: "SCREEN DIRECTORS PLAYHOUSE. Bringing you each week an outstanding original screenplay chosen and directed by one of the country's foremost motion picture directors."

Sources
Audio Classics Archive Radio Logs: Screen Directors Playhouse

References

External links

Screen Directors Playhouse at the TCM Movie Database
Screen Directors Playhouse at TV Guide
Screen Directors Playhouse at CATV with episode list

Listen to

1955 American television series debuts
1956 American television series endings
1940s American radio programs
1950s American radio programs
1950s American drama television series
American radio dramas
Anthology radio series
Black-and-white American television shows
English-language television shows
NBC original programming
American Broadcasting Company original programming
Radio programs based on films
Radio programmes based on novels
NBC radio programs